= Pedro Bernáldez de Sahagún =

Spanish politician and knight

Pedro Bernaldez de Sahagun
- Knight
- Born: 12th-century Iberian Peninsula
- Died: 12th-century Iberian Peninsula

Pedro Bernaldez de Sahagun (12th-century) was a medieval knight of Castile.

His wife was María Soares da Maia, daughter of Suero Mendez de Amaya.
